Euonymus grandiflorus is a species of plant in the family Celastraceae. It is found in China, Myanmar, and Nepal.

References

grandiflorus
Least concern plants
Taxonomy articles created by Polbot